This article lists the in the water and  on the water forms of aquatic sports for 2017.

Aquatics (FINA)

World aquatics championships
 July 14–30: 2017 World Aquatics Championships in   Budapest
 The  won both the gold and overall medal tallies.
 August 7–20: 2017 FINA World Masters Championships in  Budapest
 For results, click here.
 August 23–28: 2017 FINA World Junior Swimming Championships in  Indianapolis
 The  won both the gold and overall medal tallies.
 November 27 – December 7: 2017 World Para Swimming Championships in  Mexico City
 Note: Due to the 2017 Chiapas earthquake, the championships was postponed until the end of November 2017.
  won both the gold and overall medal tallies.

2017 FINA 10 km Marathon Swimming World Cup
 February 4: MSWC #1 in  Carmen de Patagones-Viedma, Río Negro
 Winners:  Federico Vanelli (m) /  Arianna Bridi (f)
 March 11: MSWC #2 in  Abu Dhabi
 Winners:  Jack Burnell (m) /  Aurélie Muller (f)
 June 24: MSWC #3 in  Setúbal
 Winners:  Kristóf Rasovszky (m) /  Rachele Bruni (f)
 July 27: MSWC #4 in  Lac Saint-Jean
 Winners:  Simone Ruffini (m) /  Arianna Bridi (f)
 August 12: MSWC #5 in  Lake Mégantic
 Winners:  Kristóf Rasovszky (m) /  Ana Marcela Cunha (f)
 October 15: MSWC #6 in  Chun'an County (Hangzhou)
 Winners:  Kristóf Rasovszky (m) /  Ana Marcela Cunha (f)
 October 21: MSWC #7 (final) in 
 Winners:  Rob Muffels (m) /  Arianna Bridi (f)

2017 FINA Open Water Swimming Grand Prix
 February 5: OWGP #1 in  Santa Fe-Coronda
 Winners:  Damián Blaum (m) /  Barbara Pozzobon (f)
 July 29: OWGP #2 in  Lac Saint-Jean
 Winners:  Guillermo Bertola (m) /  Martina Grimaldi (f)
 August 19: OWGP #3 in  Lake Ohrid
 Winners:  Alexander Studzinski (m) /  Barbara Pozzobon (f)
 September 3: OWGP #4 (final) in  Capri-Naples
 Winners:  Matteo Furlan (m) /  Ana Marcela Cunha (f)

2017 FINA Diving World Series
 March 3–5: DWS #1 in  Beijing
 3m Springboard winners:  Jack Laugher (m) /  Shi Tingmao (f)
 10m Platform winners:  Chen Aisen (m) /  Si Yajie (f)
 Synchronized 3m winners:  (Cao Yuan & Xie Siyi) (m) /  (Shi Tingmao &  XU Zhihuan) (f)
 Synchronized 10m winners:  (Chen Aisen & Yang Hao) (m) /  (Chang Yani & Ren Qian) (f)
 Mixed winners:  (Wang Han & LI Zheng) (3m) /  (LIAN Jie & LIAN Junjie) (10m)
 March 9–11: DWS #2 in  Guangzhou
 3m Springboard winners:  Xie Siyi (m) /  Shi Tingmao (f)
 10m Platform winners:  Chen Aisen (m) /  Si Yajie (f)
 Synchronized 3m winners:  (Xie Siyi & Cao Yuan) (m) /  (Shi Tingmao &  XU Zhihuan) (f)
 Synchronized 10m winners:  (Chen Aisen & Yang Hao) (m) /  (Chang Yani & Ren Qian) (f)
 Mixed winners:  (Wang Han & LI Zheng) (3m) /  (LIAN Jie & LIAN Junjie) (10m)
 March 31 – April 2: DWS #3 in  Kazan
 3m Springboard winners:  Cao Yuan (m) /  Shi Tingmao (f)
 10m Platform winners:  Chen Aisen (m) /  Ren Qian (f)
 Synchronized 3m winners:  (Xie Siyi & Cao Yuan) (m) /  (Chang Yani & Shi Tingmao) (f)
 Synchronized 10m winners:  (Chen Aisen & Yang Hao) (m) /  (Ren Qian & Si Yajie) (f)
 Mixed winners:  (Wang Han & LI Zheng) (3m) /  (LIAN Jie & LIAN Junjie) (10m)
 April 21–23: DWS #4 in  Windsor, Ontario (final)
 3m Springboard winners:  Jack Laugher (m) /  Shi Tingmao (f)
 10m Platform winners:  Chen Aisen (m) /  Si Yajie (f)
 Synchronized 3m winners:  (Evgeny Kuznetsov & Ilya Zakharov) (m) /  (Chang Yani & Shi Tingmao) (f)
 Synchronized 10m winners:  (Chen Aisen & Yang Hao) (m) /  (Ren Qian & Si Yajie) (f)
 Mixed winners:  (Wang Han & LI Zheng) (3m) /  (LIAN Jie & LIAN Junjie) (10m)

2017 FINA Diving Grand Prix
 February 24–26: DGP #1 in  Rostock
 3m Springboard winners:  PENG Jianfeng (m) /  WU Chunting (f)
 10m Platform winners:  Yang Jian (m) /  ZHANG Minjie (f)
 Synchronized 3m winners:  (Stephan Feck & Patrick Hausding) (m) /  (Melissa Citrini Beaulieu & Jennifer Abel) (f)
 Synchronized 10m winners:  (Roman Izmailov & Sergey Nazin) (m; default) /  (ZHANG Minjie & ZHANG Jiaqi) (f)
 April 6–9: DGP #2 in  Gatineau
 3m Springboard winners:  He Chao (m) /  JIA Dongjin (f)
 10m Platform winners:  Yang Jian (m) /  Nana Sasaki (f)
 Synchronized 3m winners:  (He Chao & LIU Chengming) (m) /  (CHEN Huiling & JIA Dongjin) (f)
 Synchronized 10m winners:  (Matthew Dixon & Noah Williams) (m) /  (LIU Xin & ZHANG Rui) (f)
 Mixed Synchronized winners:  (Jennifer Abel & François Imbeau-Dulac) (3m) /  (Kazuki Murakami & Minami Itahashi) (10m)
 May 4–7: DGP #3 in  San Juan, Puerto Rico
 3m Springboard winners:  Sebastián Morales (m) /  Chen Yiwen (f)
 10m Platform winners:  Matty Lee (m) /  LIU Xin (f)
 Synchronized 3m winners:  (Freddy Woodward & James Heatly) (m) /  (LIU Lingrui & Huang Xiaohui) (f)
 Synchronized 10m winners:  (XU Zewei & Tai Xiaohu) (m) /  (LIU Xin & ZHANG Rui) (f)
 Mixed Synchronized winners:  (Nishida Reo & Hazuki Miyamoto) (3m) /  (Matty Lee & Robyn Birch) (10m)
 May 26–28: DGP #4 in  Madrid
 3m Springboard winners:  Giovanni Tocci (m) /  Pamela Ware (f)
 10m Platform winners:  Randal Willars Valdez (m) /  ZHANG Jiaqi (f)
 Synchronized 3m winners:  (François Imbeau-Dulac & Peter Thach Mai) (m) /  (Mia Vallee & Olivia Chamandy) (f)
 Synchronized 10m winners:  (Kevin Berlin Reyes & Jose Diego Balleza Isaias) (m) /  (ZHANG Jiaqi & ZHANG Minjie) (f)
 July 5–7: DGP #5 in  Bolzano
 3m Springboard winners:  Sebastián Morales (m) /  Yuka Mabuchi (f)
 10m Platform winners:  Isaac Souza Filho (m) /  ZHANG Nanju (f)
 Synchronized 3m winners:  (Evgenii Novoselov & Viacheslav Novoselov) (m) /  (Yasmin Harper & Scarlett Mew Jensen) (f)
 Synchronized 10m winners:  (Egor Galperin & Boris Efremov) (m; default) /  (Chiara Pellacani & Noemi Batki) (f)
 Mixed Synchronized winners:  (Elena Bertocchi & Maicol Verzotto) (3m) /  (Noemi Batki & Maicol Verzotto) (10m)
 October 26–29: DGP #6 in  Kuala Lumpur
 3m Springboard winners:  Woo Ha-ram (m) /  Wang Han (f)
 10m Platform winners:  Tai Xiaohu (m) /  ZHANG Jiaqi (f)
 Synchronized 3m winners:  (Kim Yeong-nam & Woo Ha-ram) (m) /  (Hazuki Miyamoto & Sayaka Mikami) (f)
 Synchronized 10m winners:  (Kim Yeong-nam & Woo Ha-ram) (m) /  (Leong Mun Yee & Pandelela Rinong) (f)
 Mixed Synchronized winners:  (Hazuki Miyamoto & Nishida Reo) (3m) /  (Cheong Jun Hoong & Jellson Jabillin) (10m)
 November 2–5: DGP #7 in 
 3m Springboard winners:  Kim Yeong-nam (m) /  Chen Yiwen (f)
 10m Platform winners:  Tai Xiaohu (m) /  ZHANG Jiaqi (f)
 Synchronized 3m winners:  (Kim Yeong-nam & Woo Ha-ram) (m) /  (Yasmin Harper & Scarlett Mew Jensen) (f)
 Synchronized 10m winners:  (Kim Yeong-nam & Woo Ha-ram) (m) /  (KIM Kwang Hui & KIM Mi Hwa) (f)
 Mixed Synchronized winners:  (Kim Su-ji & Woo Ha-ram) (3m) /  (CHO Eun-bi & Kim Yeong-nam) (10m)
 November 9–12: DGP #8 (final) in  Gold Coast, Queensland
 3m Springboard winners:  Xie Siyi (m) /  Chen Yiwen (f)
 10m Platform winners:  Yang Jian (m) /  Pandelela Rinong (f)
 Synchronized 3m winners:  (Cao Yuan & Xie Siyi) (m) /  (Krysta Palmer & Maria Coburn) (f)
 Synchronized 10m winners:  (Aleksandr Belevtsev & Nikita Shleikher) (m) /  (Melissa Wu & Taneka Kovchenko) (f)
 Mixed Synchronized winners:  (Martin Wolfram & Tina Punzel) (3m) /  (Gemma McArthur & Lucas Thomson) (10m)

2017 FINA High Diving World Cup
 April 27–29: 2017 FINA High Diving World Cup in  Abu Dhabi
 Women's 20 m winner:  Rita Jimenez Trejo
 Men's 27 m winner:  Gary Hunt

2017 FINA Swimming World Cup
 August 2 & 3: SWC #1 in  Moscow
  won both the gold and overall medal tallies.
 August 6 & 7: SWC #2 in  Berlin
  won the gold medal tally. The  won the overall medal tally.
 August 11 & 12: SWC #3 in  Eindhoven
  and  won 4 gold medals each. The  won the overall medal tally.
 September 30 & October 1: SWC #4 in 
  won the gold medal tally. The  won the overall medal tally.
 October 4 & 5: SWC #5 in  Doha
  won the gold medal tally.  and the  won 13 overall medals each.
 November 10 & 11: SWC #6 in  Beijing
  won both the gold and overall medal tallies.
 November 14 & 15: SWC #7 in  Tokyo
  and  won 5 gold medals each. Japan won the overall medal tally.
 November 18 & 19: SWC #8 (final) in 
  and  won 5 gold medals each. Australia won the overall medal tally.

2017 FINA Synchronized Swimming World Series
 March 10–12: SSWS #1 in  Paris
 Free/Technical Solo winner:  Anna Voloshyna
 Free/Technical Duet winners:  (Jiang Wenwen & Jiang Tingting)
 Free/Technical Mixed Duet winners:  (Manila Flamini & Giorgio Minisini)
 Free Combination & Team Routine winners: 
 April 22–24: SSWS #2 in  Taiyuan
 Free/Technical Solo winners:  Lee Lee /  Anita Alvarez
 Free/Technical Duet winners:  (Li Xiaolu & Sun Wenyan)
 Free/Technical Mixed Duet winners:  (SHI Haoyu & SHENG Shuwen)
 Free Combination & Team Routine winners: 
 April 28–30: SSWS #3 in  Tokyo
 Free/Technical Solo winner:  Ona Carbonell
 Free/Technical Duet winners:  (Yukiko Inui & Kanami Nakamaki) /  (Yukiko Inui & Mai Nakamura)
 Free Mixed Duet winners:  (Abe Atsushi & Yumi Adachi)
 Free Combination & Team Routine winners: 
 May 2–7: SSWS #4 in  Toronto
 Free/Technical Solo winner:  Anna Voloshyna
 Free/Technical Duet winner:  (Anna Voloshyna & Yelyzaveta Yakhno)
 Free/Technical Mixed Duet winners:  (Robert Prévost & Isabelle Rampling) (default)
 Free Combination & Team Routine winners: 
 May 25–28: SSWS #5 in  Las Palmas
 Free/Technical Solo winner:  Ona Carbonell
 Free/Technical Duet winners:  (Ona Carbonell & Paula Ramirez)
 Free/Technical Mixed Duet winners:  (Yumi Adachi & Abe Atsushi)
 Free Combination & Team Routine winners: 
 June 22–24: SSWS #6 in  Long Island (East Meadow, New York)
 Solo winner:  Ona Carbonell
 Duet winners:  (Ona Carbonell & Paula Ramirez)
 Team winners: 
 Mixed Duet winners:  (Kanako Spendlove & Bill May)
 September 21–24: SSWS #7 (final) in  Tashkent
 Solo winner:  Ona Carbonell
 Duet winners:  (Anna Voloshyna & Yelyzaveta Yakhno)
 Team winners: 
 Mixed Duet winners:  (Abe Atsushi & Yumi Adachi)

LEN (Aquatics)
 May 5–7: 2017 European Synchronised Swimming Champions Cup in  Cuneo
 Free/Technical Duet winners:  (Ona Carbonell & Paula Ramirez) (2 times)
 Free/Technical Mixed Duet winners:  (Manila Flamini & Giorgio Minisini) (2 times)
 Free/Technical Team winners:  (2 times)
 Team Highlight winners: 
 Free Combination winners: 
 June 12–18: 2017 European Diving Championships in  Kyiv
 1m Springboard winners:  Illya Kvasha (m) /  Elena Bertocchi (f)
 3m Springboard winners:  Ilya Zakharov (m) /  Hanna Pysmenska (f)
 10m Platform winners:  Benjamin Auffret (m) /  Lois Toulson (f)
 Synchronized 3m winners:  (Ilya Zakharov & Evgeny Kuznetsov) (m) /  (Nadezhda Bazhina & Kristina Ilinykh) (f)
 Synchronized 10m winners:  (Maksym Dolhov & Oleksandr Horshkovozov) (m) /  (Ruby Bower & Phoebe Banks) (f)
 Mixed winners:  (Elena Bertocchi & Maicol Verzotto) (3m) /  (Lois Toulson & Matty Lee) (10m)
 Team event winners:  (Laura Marino & Matthieu Rosset)
 June 21–25: 2017 European Junior Synchronised Swimming Championship in  Belgrade
 Solo Preliminary/Free winners:  Tatiana Gayday
 Duo Preliminary/Free winners:  (Milena Maretich & Karina Tashagadzhieva)
 Team Preliminary/Free winners: 
 Free Combination Preliminary/Free winners: 
 Figures winner:  Daria Kulagina
 June 27 – July 2: 2017 European Junior Diving Championship in  Bergen
 1m Springboard winners:  Jonathan Suckow (m) /  Ekaterina Nekrasova (f)
 3m Springboard winners:  Nikita Nikolaev (m) /  Ekaterina Nekrasova (f)
 10m Platform winners:  Matthew Dixon (m) /  Anna Chuinyshena (f)
 Synchronized 3m Springboard winners:  (Patrick Kreisel & Lou Massenberg) (m) /  (Ekaterina Nekrasova & Uliana Kliueva) (f)
 Synchronized 10m Platform winners:  (Ruslan Ternovoi & Maksim Malofeev) (m) /  (Sofiia Lyskun & Valeriia Liulko) (f)
 Mixed winners: 
 June 28 – July 2: 2017 European Junior Swimming Championships in  Netanya
  and  won 11 gold medals each. Russia won the overall medal tally.
 August 4–6: 2017 European Junior Open Water Swimming Championships in  Marseille
 Junior 5 km winners:  Szilar Galyassy (m) /  Giulia Salin (f)
 Men's Junior 7.5 km winner:  Clement Batte
 Junior 10 km winners:  Logan Fontaine (m) /  Melinda Novoszath (f)
 Junior 5 km mixed relay (14–16 years old) winners:  (Daniil Orlov, Ekaterina Zotova, Yana Kurtseva, & Nikita Khotko)
 Junior 5 km mixed relay (14–19 years old) winners:  (Oceane Cassignol, Clement Batte, Lisa Pou, & Logan Fontaine)
 December 13–17: 2017 European Short Course Swimming Championships in  Copenhagen
  won both the gold and overall medal tallies.

2017 Red Bull Cliff Diving World Series
 June 24: #1 in  Serpent's Lair, Inis Mór
 Winners:  Gary Hunt (m) /  Rhiannan Iffland (f)
 July 9: #2 in  Vila Franca do Campo, São Miguel, Azores
 Winners:  Orlando Duque (m) /  Adriana Jimenez (f)
 July 23: #3 in  Bastione di Santo Stefano, Polignano a Mare
 Winners:  Alessandro De Rose (m) /  Rhiannan Iffland (f)
 September 3: #4 in  Possum Kingdom Lake, Texas
 Winners:  Blake Aldridge (m) /  Rhiannan Iffland (f)
 September 16: #5 in  Stari Most, Mostar
 Winners:  Gary Hunt (m) /  Cesilie Carlton (f)
 October 21: #6 (final) in  Saltos de Riñinahue, Lago Ranco
 Winners:  Jonathan Paredes (m) /  Rhiannan Iffland (f)

Canoeing

Canoe sprint
 April 8 – September 24: 2017 ICF Canoe Sprint Schedule

International canoe sprint championships
 June 22–25: 2017 European Junior and U23 Canoe Sprint Championships in  Belgrade
  won the gold medal tally.  won the overall medal tally.
 July 14–16: 2017 Canoe Sprint European Championships in  Plovdiv
  won both the gold and overall medal tallies.
 July 27–30: 2017 ICF Junior and U23 Canoe Sprint World Championships in  Pitești
 Junior:  won both the gold and overall medal tallies.
 U23:  won the gold medal tally.  won the overall medal tally.
 August 23–27: 2017 ICF Canoe Sprint World Championships in  Račice
  won both the gold and overall medal tallies.

2017 Canoe Sprint World Cup
 May 19–21: #1 in  Montemor-o-Velho
  and  won 5 gold medals each. Hungary won the overall medal tally.
 May 26–28: #2 in  Szeged
  won both the gold and overall medal tallies.
 June 2–4: #3 (final) in  Belgrade
  won both the gold and overall medal tallies.

Canoe slalom
 January 28 – October 8: 2017 ICF Canoe Slalom Schedule

International canoe slalom championships
 January 28–30: 2017 Oceania Canoe Slalom Championships in  Auckland
 C1 winners:  Ryan Westley (m) /  Jessica Fox (f)
 K1 winners:  Michal Smolen (m) /  Jessica Fox (f)
 May 31 – June 4: 2017 European Canoe Slalom Championships in  Tacen
  and  won 2 gold medals each. The  won the overall medal tally.
 July 18–23: 2017 ICF World Junior and U23 Canoe Slalom Championships in  Bratislava
 Junior:  won the gold medal tally. The  won the overall medal tally.
 U23: The  won both the gold and overall medal tallies.
 August 17–20: 2017 European Junior and U23 Canoe Slalom Championships in  Hagen-Hohenlimburg
 The  won both the gold and overall medal tallies.
 September 27 – October 1: 2017 ICF Canoe Slalom World Championships in  Pau
 The  won both the gold and overall medal tallies.

2017 Canoe Slalom World Cup
 June 16–18: #1 in  Prague
 C1 winners:  Sideris Tasiadis (m) /  Kimberley Woods (f)
 Men's C2 winners:  (Jonáš Kašpar & Marek Šindler)
 K1 winners:  Vít Přindiš (m) /  Maialen Chourraut (f)
 Mixed C2 winners:  (Tereza Fišerová & Jakub Jáně)
 Extreme K1 winners:  Michael Dawson (m) /  Amálie Hilgertová (f)
 June 23–25: #2 in  Augsburg
 C1 winners:  Matej Beňuš (m) /  Jessica Fox (f)
 Men's C2 winners:  (Robert Behling & Thomas Becker)
 K1 winners:  Vít Přindiš (m) /  Ricarda Funk (f)
 Extreme K1 winners:  Boris Neveu (m) /  Jasmin Schornberg (f)
 June 30 – July 2: #3 in  Markkleeberg
 C1 winners:  Michal Martikán (m) /  Jessica Fox (f)
 Men's C2 winners:  (Jonáš Kašpar & Marek Šindler)
 K1 winners:  Giovanni De Gennaro (m) /  Ricarda Funk (f)
 Extreme K1 winners:  Vít Přindiš (m) /  Tereza Fišerová (f)
 September 1–3: #4 in  Ivrea
 C1 winners:  Sideris Tasiadis (m) /  Jessica Fox (f)
 Men's C2 winners:  (Ladislav Škantár & Peter Škantár)
 K1 winners:  Vít Přindiš (m) /  Ricarda Funk (f)
 Extreme K1 winners:  Hannes Aigner (m) /  Ana Sátila (f)
 September 8–10: #5 (final) in  La Seu d'Urgell
 C1 winners:  Benjamin Savšek (m) /  Núria Vilarrubla (f)
 Men's C2 winners:  (Robert Behling & Thomas Becker)
 K1 winners:  Peter Kauzer (m) /  Ricarda Funk (f)
 Extreme K1 winners:  Hannes Aigner (m) /  Martina Wegman (f)

Other international canoeing events
 June 30 – July 2: 2017 Canoe Marathon European Championships in  Ponte de Lima
 Note: This event was supposed to be hosted in Vila Nova de Gaia, but an ICF official stated that the venue's conditions were unsatisfactory.
  won both the gold and overall medal tallies.
 July 26–30: 2017 ICF Wildwater Canoeing Junior and U23 World Championships in  Murau-Mur
 Nations Cup Sprint winners: 
 Individual Sprint winners: The  won the gold medal tally.  won the overall medal tally.
 Team Sprint winners:  won both the gold and overall medal tallies.
 Nations Cup Classical winners: The 
 Individual Classical winners: The  won both the gold and overall medal tallies.
 Team Classical winners: The  won both the gold and overall medal tallies.
 August 19–25: 2017 ICF Canoe Sailing World Championships in  Pwllheli (Pwllheli Sailing Club)
 AC winner:  Stephen Bowen; IC winner:  Robin Wood; TAIFUN winner:  Cladius Junge
 August 23–27: 2017 ICF Paracanoe World Championships in  Račice
  won the gold medal tally.  won the overall medal tally.
 August 23–27: 2017 European Canoe Polo Championship in  Saint-Omer
 Champions (Men): ; Second: ; Third: 
 Champions (Women): ; Second: ; Third: 
 Champions (Men's U21): ; Second: ; Third: 
 Champions (Women's U21): ; Second: ; Third: 
 September 3–8: 2017 ICF Dragon Boat Club Crew World Championships in  Venice
 For results, click here.
 September 7–10: 2017 ICF Canoe Marathon World Championships in  Pietermaritzburg
  won both the gold and overall medal tallies.
 September 27 – October 1: 2017 ICF Wildwater Canoeing World Championships in  Pau
 C1 winners:  Ondrej Rolenc (m) /  Claire Haab (f)
 C2 winners:  (Quentin Dazeur & Stephane Santamaria) (m) /  (Anezka Paloudova & Marie Nemcova) (f)
 K1 winners:  Anze Urankar (m) /  Claire Bren (f)
 Overall Nations Cup winner: 
 November 18 & 19: 2017 ICF Ocean Racing World Championships in 
 Open winners:  Cory Hill (m) /  Hayley Nixon Jo (f)
 U23 winners:  John Kenneth Rice (m) /  Linnea Stensils (f)
 U18 winners:  Oscar Jones (m) /  Sabina Lawrie (f)
 November 27 – December 2: 2017 ICF Canoe Freestyle World Championships in  San Juan, Argentina
 SQRT winners:  Clay Wright (m) /  Claire O'Hara (f)
 Senior kayak winners:  Joaquim Fontane I Maso (m) /  Claire O'Hara (f)
 Junior kayak winners:  Tom Dolle (m) /  Ottilie Robinson-Shaw (f)
 Men's canoe winner:  Dane Jackson

Rowing

International rowing events
 February 4: 2017 European Rowing Indoor Championships in  Paris
 For results, click here.
 May 20 & 21: 2017 European Junior Rowing Championships in  Krefeld
  won both the gold and overall medal tallies.
 May 26–28: 2017 European Rowing Championships in  Račice
  and  won 3 gold medals each. Italy won the overall medal tally.
 July 19–23: 2017 World Rowing Under 23 Championships in  Plovdiv
  won both the gold and overall medal tallies.
 September 7–10: 2017 World Rowing Masters Regatta in  Bled
 For results, click here. 
 September 24 – October 1: 2017 World Rowing Championships in  Sarasota, Florida
Italy won the overall medal tally.
 October 13–15: 2017 World Rowing Coastal Championships in  Thonon-les-Bains
  won both the gold and overall medal tallies.

2017 World Rowing Cup
 May 5–7: #1 in  Belgrade
  won both the gold and overall medal tallies.
 June 15–18: #2 in  Poznań
  won the gold medal tally.  won the overall medal tally.
 July 7–9: #3 (final) in  Lucerne
  won both the gold and overall medal tallies.

Sailing

2017 Sailing World Cup
 January 22–29: SWC #1 in  Miami
Great Britain won the overall medal tally.
 April 23–30: SWC #2 in  Hyères
  won both the gold and overall medal tallies.
 June 4–11: SWC (#3) finals in  Santander
  won both the gold and overall medal tallies.

2017 America's Cup
May 26 – June 12: 2017 Louis Vuitton Cup in  Great Sound, Hamilton
 Winners:  Emirates Team New Zealand
June 17–27: 2017 America's Cup in  Great Sound, Hamilton
  Emirates Team New Zealand defeated  Oracle Team USA, 7–1.
June 20 & 21: 2017 Youth America's Cup in  Great Sound, Hamilton
 Winners:  Land Rover BAR Academy (50 points); Second:  NZL Sailing Team (48 points); Third:  Team Tilt (42 points)

See also: 2015–16 America's Cup World Series, to determine the starting points score of the teams taking part in the 2017 Louis Vuitton Cup.

International sailing events
 November 6, 2016 – January 19: 2016–17 Vendée Globe, starting and finishing in  Les Sables-d'Olonne
  Armel Le Cléac'h won in a record time of 74 days, 3 hours and 35 minutes
 June 29 – July 9: 2017 Star World Championships in  Troense Bådelaug, Tåsinge
 Winners:  (Eivind Melleby & Joshua Revkin) (Royal Norwegian Yacht Club)
 July 7–15: 2017 2017 470 World Championships in  Thessaloniki
 Winners:  (Mathew Belcher & William Ryan) (m) /  (Agnieszka Skrzypulec & Irmina Gliszczyńska) (f)
 July 30 – August 5: 2017 Youth Match Racing World Championships at the Balboa Yacht Club in  Corona del Mar, Newport Beach
  Team Harry Price defeated  Team Ettore Botticini, with the score of 3–2 in the final.
 September 5–10: 2017 2017 Nacra 17 World Championship in  La Grande-Motte
  Ben Saxton & Katie Dabson defeated  Fernando Echavarri & Tara Pacheco, with the score of 92–95 in the final.
 September 16–23: 2017 RS:X World Championships in  Enoshima
 Individual winners:  YE Bing (m) /  Chen Peina (f)
 U21 winners:  Angel Granda Roque (m) /  Stefania Elfutina (f)
 December 9–16: 2017 ISAF Youth Sailing World Championships in  Sanya
 Note: This event was to be hosted in Akko, but it withdrew because of funding problems.
 The  and  won 2 gold medals each.  won the overall medal tally.
 Nations Trophy winners:

Surfing

World surfing championships
 May 20–28: 2017 ISA World Surfing Games in  Biarritz
 Men's Open winners: First:  Jhony Corzo; Second:  Joan Duru; Third:  Pedro Henrique; Fourth: Jonathan González
 Women's Open winners: First:  Pauline Ado; Second:  Johanne Defay; Third:  Leilani McGonagle; Fourth:  Bianca Buitendag
 Team winners: First:  (4,275 points); Second:  (2,850 points); Third:  (2,560 points); Fourth:  (2,455 points)
 Aloha Cup winners: First: ; Second: ; Third: ; Fourth: The 
 September 1–10: 2017 ISA World StandUp Paddle and Paddleboard Championship in  Vorupør and Copenhagen
 SUP Surfing winners:  Luiz Diniz (m) /  Shakira Westdorp (f)
 Sprint winners:  Casper Steinfath (m) /  Manca Notar (f)
 SUP Distance Racing winners:  Bruno Hasulyo (m) /  Annabel Anderson (f)
 Paddle Distance Racing winners:  Lachie Landsdown (m) /  Jordan Mercer (f)
 SUP Technical winners:  Mo Freitas (m) /  Annabel Anderson (f)
 Paddle Technical winners:  Lachie Landsdown (m) /  Jordan Mercer (f)
 Overall Team Points -> Champions: ; Second: ; Third: 
 September 23 – October 1: 2017 ISA World Junior Surfing Championship in  Hyūga, Miyazaki
 U18 winners:  Ignacio Gundesen (m) /  Brisa Hennessy (f)
 U16 winners:  Joh Azuchi (m) /  Alyssa Spencer (f)
 Aloha Cup -> Champions: ; Second: ; Third: ; Fourth: 
 Team Points -> Champions: ; Second: ; Third: 
 September 30 – October 8: 2017 ISA Kneeboard World Championship in  Cantabria
  won both the gold and overall medal tallies.
 Aloha Cup Champions: ; Second: ; Third: ; Fourth: 
 November 30 – December 3: 2017 ISA World Adaptive Surfing Championship in  La Jolla
 Champions: ; Second: ; Third: ; Fourth:

2017 World Surf League (WSL) Men's Championship Tour

 Overall winner:  John John Florence

2017 World Surf League (WSL) Women's Championship Tour

 Overall winner:  Tyler Wright

Water polo

2017 FINA Men's Water Polo World League
 November 15, 2016 – April 11, 2017: 2016–17 FINA Men's European Water Polo Preliminary Rounds
 April 25–30: 2017 FINA Men's Intercontinental Water Polo Tournament in  Gold Coast, Queensland
 June 20–25: 2017 FINA Men's Water Polo World League Superfinal in  Ruza
  defeated , 10–9, to win their fifth consecutive and 11th overall FINA Men's Water Polo World League title.
  took the bronze medal.

2017 FINA Women's Water Polo World League
 November 29, 2016 – April 18, 2017: 2016–17 FINA Women's European Preliminary Rounds
 May 2–7: 2017 FINA Women's Intercontinental Water Polo Tournament in  Sacramento, California
 June 6–11: 2017 FINA Women's Water Polo League Superfinal in  Shanghai
 The  defeated , 12–6, to win their fourth consecutive and 11th overall FINA Women's Water Polo League title.
  took third place.

Water polo world championships
 August 5–13: 2017 FINA Junior Water Polo World Championships in  Belgrade
  defeated , 12–10 in a shootout and after a 7–7 score in regular play, to win their second FINA Junior Water Polo World Championships title.
  took the bronze medal.
 September 3–9: 2017 FINA World Women's Junior Water Polo Championships in  Volos
  defeated , 8–7 in penalties and after a 9–9 score in regular play, to win their second FINA World Women's Junior Water Polo Championships title.
 The  took the bronze medal.

Ligue Européenne de Natation
 September 30, 2016 – May 27, 2017: 2016–17 LEN Champions League (final six in  Budapest)
  Szolnok defeated  VK Jug, 10–5, to win their first LEN Champions League title.
  Pro Recco took third place.
 December 1, 2016 – April 29, 2017: LEN Euro League Women
  Kinef Kirishi defeated  Olympiacos, 7–6, to win their first LEN Euro League Women title.
  CN Sabadell took third place.
 October 14, 2016 – April 5, 2017: 2016–17 LEN Euro Cup
  Ferencvárosi TC defeated  CSM Digi Oradea, 19–13 on aggregate, to win their first LEN Euro Cup title.
 August 20–27: 2017 European Junior Women's Water Polo Championship in  Novi Sad
 September 10–17: 2017 European Junior Men's Water Polo Championship in 
  defeated , 11–10, in the final.  took third place.

Water Ski & Wakeboard

 January 5–8: 2017 World Junior Water Ski Championships in  Santiago
 Slalom winners:  Robert Hazelwood (m) /  Jaimee Bull (f)
 Tricks winners:  Patricio Font (m) /  Anna Gay (f)
 Jump winners:  Conley Pinette (m) /  Dominique Grondin-Allard (f)
 Overall winners:  Joel Poland (m) /  Brooke Baldwin (f)
 January 30 – February 5: 2017 Asia Oceania Waterski & Wakeboard Championships in  Auckland
 Slalom winners:  Nicholas Adams (m) /  Hilary Munro (f)
 Tricks winners:  Archie Davis (m) /  Aaliyah Yoong-Hanifah (f)
 Jump winners:  Lance Green (m) /  Saaya Hirosawa (f)
 Overall winners:  Archie Davis (m) /  Katelyn Miller (f)
 Wakeboard winners:  Tony Iacconi (m) /  Yun Hee-hyun (f)
 April 24–30: 2017 World Disabled Waterski Championships in  Myuna Bay
 Men's Standing overall winner:  Craig Timm
 Seated Overal winners:  Derek Vanderbom (m) /  Delphine Le Sausse (f)
 Vision Impaired Overall winners:  Daniele Cassioli (m) /  Kate Mawby (f)
 July 13–16: 2017 World Under 21 Waterski Championships in  Dnipro
 Slalom winners:  Taylor Garcia (m) /  Allie Nicholson (f)
 Tricks winners:  Danylo Fil'Chenko (m) /  Anna Gay (f)
 Jump winners:  Jack Critchley (m) /  Dominique Grondin-Allard (f)
 Overall winners:  Danylo Fil'Chenko (m) /  Anna Gay (f)
 Team winners: 
 July 26 – August 6: 2017 World Waterski Racing Championships in  Seattle
 Open winners:  Ben Gulley (m) /  Chelsea Blight (f)
 F2 winners:  Cameron Osborne (m) /  Ellen Jones (f)
 Junior winners:  Luke Harrison (m) /  Milana Long (f)
 September 3–10: 2017 Water Ski World Championships in  Paris
 Jump winners:  Ryan Dodd (m) /  Jacinta Carroll (f)
 Slalom winners:  Frederick Winter (m) /  Regina Jaquess (f)
 Tricks winners:  Adam Pickos (m) /  Neilly Ross (f)
 Overall winners:  Felipe Miranda (m) /  Regina Jaquess (f)

References

External links
 FINA – Fédération Internationale de Natation (International Swimming Federation)
 International Canoe Federation
 World Rowing
 World Sailing
 International Surfing Association
 International Waterski & Wakeboard Federation

 
2017 in sports
Water sports by year
Aquatics